Catalana vohilava is a moth of the  family Noctuidae. It was described by Pierre Viette in 1954. It is found on Madagascar.

References

Moths described in 1954
Calpinae
Moths of Madagascar
Moths of Africa